Rachid Daoudi (born 21 February 1966) is a Moroccan former professional footballer who played as a midfielder for clubs including Wydad AC, Segunda División side Xerez CD, Al Wasl F.C. and Al Ain FC in the United Arab Emirates. He played for the Morocco national team and was a participant at the 1994 FIFA World Cup.

References

External links
 
 

Living people
1966 births
People from Fez, Morocco
Moroccan footballers
Association football midfielders
Morocco international footballers
1992 African Cup of Nations players
1994 FIFA World Cup players
Botola players
Primeira Liga players
Segunda División players
UAE Pro League players
Saudi Professional League players
Wydad AC players
F.C. Tirsense players
Xerez CD footballers
Al Ain FC players
Al-Wasl F.C. players
Al-Shabab FC (Riyadh) players
Moroccan expatriate footballers
Moroccan expatriate sportspeople in Portugal
Expatriate footballers in Portugal
Moroccan expatriate sportspeople in Spain
Expatriate footballers in Spain
Moroccan expatriate sportspeople in the United Arab Emirates
Expatriate footballers in the United Arab Emirates
Moroccan expatriate sportspeople in Qatar
Expatriate footballers in Qatar